In 2-dimensional hyperbolic geometry, the infinite-order pentagonal tiling is a regular tiling. It has Schläfli symbol of {5,∞}. All vertices are ideal, located at "infinity", seen on the boundary of the Poincaré hyperbolic disk projection.

Symmetry 
There is a half symmetry form, seen with alternating colors:

Related polyhedra and tiling 

This tiling is topologically related as a part of sequence of regular polyhedra and tilings with vertex figure (5n).

See also 

Pentagonal tiling
Uniform tilings in hyperbolic plane
List of regular polytopes

References

External links 

 Hyperbolic and Spherical Tiling Gallery

Hyperbolic tilings
Infinite-order tilings
Isogonal tilings
Isohedral tilings
Pentagonal tilings
Regular tilings